Kwaku Boateng (born April 26, 1995) is a Canadian football player as a defensive lineman for the Hamilton Tiger-Cats of the Canadian Football League (CFL). He played U Sports football for the Wilfrid Laurier Golden Hawks.

Early years
Boateng played four years for the Wilfrid Laurier Golden Hawks and is program's all-time sack leader. He was named a 2016 CIS Men's Football Second Team All-Canadian and is a two-time Academic All-Canadian.

Professional career

Edmonton Eskimos / Elks
Boateng was selected in the fifth round (41st overall) in the 2017 CFL Draft by the Edmonton Eskimos. He was signed by the Eskimos on May 23, 2017. He registered 21 defensive tackles, four sacks and one forced fumble in 18 regular season games during the 2017 season. In the 2017 CFL West Semi-Final, he recorded three tackles against the Winnipeg Blue Bombers. He also appeared in the West Final against the Calgary Stampeders.  He was nominated as the team's Rookie of the Year candidate for the 2017 CFL Awards. Boateng continued his strong play in 2018 with 26 defensive tackles and nine quarterback sacks. On February 1, 2019, Boateng and the Eskimos agreed to a two-year contract extension.

In 2019, he was the Edmonton Eskimos' Most Outstanding Defensive Player. He re-signed with Edmonton on a contract extension through 2021 on December 26, 2020. He became a free agent upon the expiry of his contract on February 8, 2022.

Ottawa Redblacks
On February 8, 2022, Boateng signed a one-year contract with the Ottawa Redblacks. However, he suffered an injury and did not play in any games for the team. In the following offseason, he became a free agent on February 14, 2023.

Hamilton Tiger-Cats
On February 15, 2023, it was announced that Boateng had signed with the Hamilton Tiger-Cats.

References

External links
Hamilton Tiger-Cats bio 

1995 births
Canadian football defensive linemen
Edmonton Elks players
Hamilton Tiger-Cats players
Ottawa Redblacks players
Living people
Wilfrid Laurier Golden Hawks football players
Sportspeople from Milton, Ontario
Ghanaian players of Canadian football